The fibrous cap is a layer of fibrous connective tissue, which is thicker and less cellular than the normal intima, found in atherosclerotic plaques. The fibrous cap contains macrophages and smooth muscle cells. 
The fibrous cap of an atheroma is composed of bundles of muscle cells, macrophages, foam cells, lymphocytes, collagen and elastin.

The fibrous cap is prone to rupture and ulceration which can lead to thrombosis. In advanced lesions, further complications may arise including calcification of the fibrous cap.

References 

Angiology